Il richiamo nella tempesta (i.e. "Call in the storm", also known as Gli amanti dell'infinito and  ...E le stelle non attesero invano) is a 1950 Italian melodrama-fantasy film written and directed by Oreste Palella.

Plot

Cast
Silvana Pampanini as Carla
Renato Baldini as Roberto
 Gabriella Sangro  as Dani
Carlo Tamberlani as Dr. Cianelli
 Barbara Leite  as Anna Maria
Amedeo Trilli as Spirit of the Rose
 Carlo Mazzoni  as Fabio
 Elsa Vazzoler  as Giulia
Renato Malavasi as Stefano
 Gigi Gorda as Camillo
 Gina Matelli  as Dani's Mother
 Carlo Ghisini  as Teodoro

References

External links
 

1950 films
1950s Italian-language films
Italian fantasy drama films
1950s fantasy drama films
Italian black-and-white films
Melodrama films
1950s Italian films